Francesco Cellario (1520–1569) was an Italian Protestant pastor. Born in Lacchiarella, he became the pastor of Morbegno. He was captured by Catholics and burnt at the stake in 1569.

References

1520 births
1569 deaths
Italian Protestants